Bernburg was a district in Saxony-Anhalt, Germany. It is bounded by (from the north and clockwise) the districts of Schönebeck, Köthen, Saalkreis, Mansfelder Land and Aschersleben-Staßfurt.

History 
There was an independent principality called Anhalt-Bernburg following the subdivision of the principality of Anhalt in 1603. This mini state was elevated to the rank of a duchy in 1806, and merged once more with the other parts to form a united duchy of Anhalt again in 1863.

Geography 
The small district of Bernburg is located in the historical region of Anhalt. The Saale River crosses the district from south to north.

Coat of arms

Towns and municipalities

External links 
 Official website (German)

2007 disestablishments in Germany